The 1953 College World Series was the seventh NCAA-sanctioned baseball tournament that determined a national champion.  The tournament was held as the conclusion of the 1953 NCAA baseball season and was played at Johnny Rosenblatt Stadium in Omaha, NE from June 11 to June 16.  The tournament's champion was Michigan, coached by Ray Fisher.  The Most Outstanding Player was J. L. Smith of Texas.

The tournament consisted of no preliminary round of play as teams were selected directly into the College World Series.  From 1954 to the present, teams compete in the NCAA Division I baseball tournament preliminary round(s), to determine the eight teams that will play in the College World Series.

Participants

Results

Bracket

Game results

Notable players
 Boston College: 
 Colorado State:
 Duke: Al Spangler
 Houston: Bobby Clatterbuck, Carlton Hanta
 Lafayette: 
 Michigan: Don Eaddy 
 Stanford: Chuck Essegian, Jack Shepard
 Texas:J. L. Smith

Notes

References

College World Series
College World Series
College World Series
College World Series
Baseball competitions in Omaha, Nebraska
College sports tournaments in Nebraska